The 91st Infantry Division (famously nicknamed as the "Wild West Division" with a "Fir Tree" as its Division insignia to symbolize its traditional home of the Far West) is an infantry division of the United States Army that fought in World War I and World War II. From 1946 until 2008, it was part of the United States Army Reserve. It was briefly inactivated from 2008 until 2010 when it was elevated back to a division size element as the 91st Training Division (Operations).

History

World War I

Constituted on 5 August 1917 at Camp Lewis, Washington, near Tacoma, the division, commanded by Major General Henry Alexander Greene, soon thereafter departed for England in the summer of 1918. In September 1918, the division's first operation was in the St. Mihiel Offensive in France. Serving under the U.S. Army's V Corps, the division, now commanded by Major General William Johnston Jr., fought in the Meuse-Argonne Offensive and successfully helped to destroy the German First Guard Division and continued to smash through three successive enemy lines.

Twelve days before the end of World War I, the division, as part of the VII Corps of the French Sixth Army, helped drive the Germans east across the Escaut River in the Battle of the Lys and the Escaut. The division was awarded separate campaign streamers for its active role in the Lorraine, Meuse-Argonne and Ypres-Lys campaigns.

In 1919, the 91st was inactivated at the Presidio of San Francisco.

The Division was composed of the following units:
 Headquarters, 91st Division
 181st Infantry Brigade
 361st Infantry Regiment
 362nd Infantry Regiment
 347th Machine Gun Battalion 
 182nd Infantry Brigade
 363rd Infantry Regiment
 364th Infantry Regiment
 348th Machine Gun Battalion
 166th Field Artillery Brigade
 346th Field Artillery Regiment (75 mm)
 347th Field Artillery Regiment (4.7")
 348th Field Artillery Regiment (155 mm)
 316th Trench Mortar Battery
 346th Machine Gun Battalion 
 316th Engineer Regiment
 316th Medical Regiment
 316th Field Signal Battalion
 Headquarters Troop, 91st Division
 316th Train Headquarters and Military Police
 316th Ammunition Train
 316th Supply Train
 316th Engineer Train
 316th Sanitary Train
 361st, 36nd, 363rd, and 364th Ambulance Companies and Field Hospitals

Interwar period

After being reconstituted in 1921 as part of the Organized Reserves and being assigned to the state of California, the division then served as an administrative control center for the next 21 years.

World War II
As the early battles of World War II involving the United States were being fought, the division was reactivated at Camp White, Oregon on 15 August 1942, under the command of Major General Charles H. Gerhardt. After initial training at Camp White, the division participation in the Oregon Maneuver combat exercise in the fall of 1943.

Order of battle

 Headquarters, 91st Infantry Division
 361st Infantry Regiment
 362nd Infantry Regiment
 363rd Infantry Regiment
 Headquarters and Headquarters Battery, 91st Infantry Division Artillery
 346th Field Artillery Battalion
 347th Field Artillery Battalion
 348th Field Artillery Battalion
 916th Field Artillery Battalion
 316th Engineer Combat Battalion
 316th Medical Battalion
 91st Cavalry Reconnaissance Troop (Mechanized)
 Headquarters, Special Troops, 91st Infantry Division
 Headquarters Company, 91st Infantry Division
 791st Ordnance Light Maintenance Company
 91st Quartermaster Company
 91st Signal Company
 Military Police Platoon
 Band
 91st Counterintelligence Corps Detachment

Then, the division, now under Major General William G. Livesay, departed for the European Continent on 3 April 1944. There, on the Italian Front, the 361st Regimental Combat Team was detached to participate in the battles for Rome and the Arno River. It became the first formation of the U.S. Fifth Army to reach the river. In September 1944, the division crossed the Sieve River, outflanked the famous Gothic Line, and captured the Futa Pass. For its part in combat, the division was awarded the North Apennines, Po Valley and Rome-Arno campaign streamers.

The division returned to the United States where it was inactivated at Camp Rucker, Alabama, in December 1945. Two members were awarded the Medal of Honor during the war, Roy W. Harmon and Oscar G. Johnson.

World War II statistics

Command structure
Commanding generals: Major general Charles H. Gerhardt (May 1942 – 22 July 1943); Major general William G. Livesay (July 1943 – 5 November 1945); BG Neal C. Johnson (6 November 1945 - December 1945)
Assistant Commanding generals: BG Percy W. Clarkson (- September 1942); BG Charles L. Bolte (September 1942 – February 1943); BG William E. Crist (April 1943 – December 1943); BG Raymond E. S. Williamson (14 January 1944 – 18 October 1945)
Commanding Officers Artillery: BG Edward S. Ott (1942-1943); BG Ralph Hospital (1943-1945)

Other statistics

Awards: MH-2 ; DSC-2 ; DSM-1 ; SS-528; LM-33; SM-43 ; BSM-4,152.

Theater: Mediterranean

Days of combat: 271

Campaigns:
Rome-Arno (22 Jan 44 – 9 Sep 44)
North Apennines (10 Sep 44 – 4 April 45)
Po Valley (5 Apr 45 – 8 May 45)

Casualties
Total battle casualties: 8,744
Killed in action: 1,400
Wounded in action: 6,748
Missing in action: 262
Prisoner of war: 334

Army Reserve

In December 1946, the 91st was reactivated at the Presidio of San Francisco as part of the U.S. Army Reserve. In 1959, the division was reorganized and redesignated as the 91st Division (Training). In 1993, the division was again reorganized and redesignated as the 91st Division (Exercise) and again in 1999 as the 91st Division (Training Support).

Its headquarters was at Parks Reserve Forces Training Area (PRFTA), Dublin, California, when the 2005 Base Realignment and Closure Commission recommended the Department of Defense relocate the 91st Division to Fort Hunter Liggett.

The four brigades of the 91st Division were redesignated as separate brigades:
1st Brigade (PRFTA) is now 5th Brigade, 75th Division.
2nd Brigade (Fort Carson) is now 5th Armored Brigade.
3rd Brigade (Travis AFB) is now the 402nd Field Artillery Brigade.
4th Brigade (Fort Lewis) is now 191st Infantry Brigade.

The 91st Division moved its headquarters to Fort Hunter Liggett on 1 May 2009, was reorganized and re-designated as the 91st Training Brigade (Operations) on 1 October 2009 and was then re-designated as the 91st Training Division (Operations) on 1 October 2010.

Subordinate units 

As of 2017 the following units are subordinated to the 91st Training Division (Operations):

 1st Brigade
 11th Battalion, 104th Regiment
 3rd Battalion, 290th Regiment
 2nd Battalion, 378th Regiment
 3rd Battalion, 381st Regiment
 1st Battalion, 417th Regiment

Notable members
William Borders, Army Catholic Chaplain, was awarded the Bronze Star for Valor, while serving with the 362 Infantry Regiment in bitter fighting in Italy. He later became the Archbishop of Baltimore.
Frederick Lippitt, politician and philanthropist.
Oscar Franklin Miller, Medal of Honor recipient.
Deming Bronson, Medal of Honor recipient.
Harold Hitz Burton, Associate Justice of the Supreme Court of the United States
Earl Warren, Chief Justice of the United States

In the Media
The soldiers in the TV show Combat! portray members of the 363rd (is 361st in S2Ep25&26 & others)  Infantry Regiment.

Shoulder Sleeve Insignia

References

External links
 
 
 The Story of the 91st Division 1919
 91st Infantry Division, World War I-World War II Unit History
 91st Division official lineage & honors
 The Army Almanac: A Book of Facts Concerning the Army of the United States, U.S. Government Printing Office, 1950 reproduced at CMH. 
 Answering the Call (Third Edition), Stephen L. Wilson, 2016.

091st Infantry Division, U.S.
Infantry Division, U.S. 091st
Infantry divisions of the United States Army in World War II
United States Army divisions of World War I
Military units and formations established in 1917
Training divisions of the United States Army